The  (from Catalan: "Book of Deeds";) is the autobiographical chronicle of the reign of James I of Aragon (1213–1276). It is written in Old Catalan in the first person and is the first chronologically of the four works classified as The Four Great Catalan Chronicles, all belonging to the early medieval Crown of Aragon (in the northeastern part of what is now Spain), and its first royal dynasty, the House of Barcelona. James I inherited as a child the titles of King of Aragon, Count of Barcelona, and Lord of Montpellier, but also became by conquest King of Majorca and King of Valencia. James emphasises in his chronicles his conquest of Majorca (1229) and of Valencia (1238).

James I of Aragon dedicates a couple of chapters to his mother Maria of Montpellier and his father Peter II of Aragon (called "Peter the Catholic"), who had been given the title of "" by the Pope after the Battle of Las Navas de Tolosa in which he helped Alfonso VIII of Castile fight against the Moors, one year before his death. Peter II of Aragon died defending his vassal lords of Occitania, who were accused of allowing the Cathar heresy to proliferate in their counties. He was killed in the Battle of Muret, fighting against the Crusader troops commanded by Simon de Montfort.

The conquest by James I in 1229 of Majorca, one of the Balearic Islands held by the Muslim Almohads, and his consequent founding of the Kingdom of Majorca, probably inspired him to start the dictation of his chronicles, he having had an active part in the Reconquista of the Iberian Peninsula (in the context of Europe's medieval Christian Crusades). The  narrative ends with James' death in 1276. Though the original is lost, many ancient copies of the codex have survived.

The oldest extant manuscript written in the original Catalan language, a copy dating to 1343, was commissioned by the abbot of the Poblet Monastery. An older manuscript dating to 1313, the "", was the version translated into Latin from the Catalan original "". The Latin translation is signed by the Dominican friar Pere Marsili, who was ordered by James II of Aragon (James I's grandson) to honour his grandfather's memory by promulgating his words in the internationally used Latin language.

Particular features 
As the title itself indicates, more than a bare chronicle, the Llibre dels fets is in fact a "Book of Deeds". Studies conducted in the 1980s concluded that this medieval manuscript is of an undefined literary style, since it was dictated entirely orally. James I of Aragon, a cultivated man, dictated the entire book to royal scribes, who at that point in history commonly performed the labour of actually writing the king's words with pen on paper. Its style is informal and colloquial.

Here is an extract of the first lines:

...  Raconta Mon Senyor San Jaume que la fe sense obres, morta es. Aquesta paraula va voler complr Senyor en els nostres fets...

(English: ...  says My Lord Saint James that faith without actions, is dead. This word he wanted to accomplish, Lord, in our deeds...)

The principal characteristics of James' style are:
 Religious Feeling
 The love of the King for his realms
 Direct participation in the events described
 Military and heroic spirit
 Popular and improvised language

Structure 

In the Llibre dels Fets, James I of Aragon describes his life and his most important actions, such as the conquest of the Muslim-held Valencia and Majorca. The narrative begins with his birth in 1203 and ends with his death in 1276. The prologue and epilogue are written in a different style, more erudite and perfectionist than the rest of the text, and presumably written after his death. James was generally very explicit in expressing himself, as shown in his recitation of his deeds:

E per tal que los hòmens coneguessen, quan hauríem passada aquesta vida mortal, ço que nós hauríem fet [...] e per dar eximpli a tots los altres hòmes del món...

(English: So that men acknowledge, when we have passed this mortal life, this that we have accomplished [,,,] and to give example to all the other men of the world...)

In the Latin translation of 1313 by Pere Marsili, the friar informs his readers that he has translated chapters from the manuscripts then kept in the royal archives, indicating that the texts of the chronicles already existed and that they were written in the vulgar language, i.e., not in Latin, but in Catalan.

The oldest preserved copy of the manuscript in the Catalan language is the copy ordered in 1343, more than 60 years after James' death, by the Abbot of the Poblet Monastery. The text of the Catalan manuscript is nearly identical to that of the Latin translation, but the Catalan version cannot be a copy of the Latin version, as the Catalan one is written in the first person, mainly using the majestic plural "we", and only a few times the singular "I", while the Latin version is written in the third person, using the first person in only a few quotes. This fact makes it improbable that the Catalan manuscript comes from the Latin version.

The internal structure of both versions seems to indicate two moments in time: the first part may have been dictated around 1240, shortly after James' conquest of Valencia. The facts before 1228 are explained in a brief, imprecise way even with significant errors, while from then on, the narrative shows greater detail and precision.

The supposed second part might have been dictated around 1274, and has a similar structure; the facts from 1242-1265 are condensed in a few pages, while the later years are again explicated in great detail. The prologue and the section that describes his illness and death were probably written or dictated by someone in James' trust. The Catalan copy of 1343 and the Latin translation of 1313 have left posterity the same content.

General content 
The content of the Llibre dels fets, the chronicles of James I, can be divided into four parts:
 1208–1228: Some chapters dedicated to his ancestors and parents, his mother (Maria of Montpellier) by whom he was Lord of Montpellier, and to his father (Peter II of Aragon "The Catholic"), by whom he was King of Aragon, Count of Barcelona and Count of Urgell. James' quite unexpected birth. Chapters dedicated to his father's death, known as Peter "The Catholic" (title of "Rex Catholicissimus" given to him by the Pope, after the battle of Las Navas de Tolosa against the Moors), and his death at the battle of Muret, while defending his vassal Lords of Occitania against the invading crusader troops, mostly Frankish, commanded by Simon de Montfort, 5th Earl of Leicester in the context of the Cathar Crusade (or Albigensian Crusade, as it started at the southern city of Albi, while casually the Regent Queen of the Franks at that time was Blanche of Castile). James' captivity at the age of 5 after his father's death, and how Simon de Montfort wanted to marry him to his daughter (failed plan that would have brought the De Montfort family into the Crown of Aragon). Finally James was returned to Aragon, where the Templar Knights, a powerful military religious order within the medieval Crown of Aragon), guarded and raised him. James' childhood at Monzon Castle, (the Templars' main castle). He also explains his further marriage to Eleanor of Castile.
 1229–1240: The most detailed part of the "Llibre dels fets". The conquest of Majorca (1229). This would be the first step in the history of the Crown of Aragon. Shortly after that would come the conquest of Valencia in 1238. The book tries to prove how King James accomplishments were Divine Will.
 1240–1265: Describes the conflicts with the Saracen rebels from Valencia.
 1265–1276:  Again a narrative describing the battles against the Moors. The conquest of Murcia. Also a lot of political episodes which claim to justify his actions. The last chapters, which explain the king's illness and death were written and included in the Chronicle presumably after James' death.

Language and style 
A didactic and justifying intention is largely reflected throughout the chronicle as a religious impulse, indicating that James I believed the execution of the work was guided by divine providence. The king, who normally desired to appear as an epic hero, not only recounts military and political history in the narrative, but also frequently mentions small details of his daily life, as well as some of his most intimate thoughts.

A "popular and vivid language" full of proverbs and colloquial expressions is used in the chronicles, which also quote foreign personages speaking other languages such as Aragonese, Galician-Portuguese (used by the Crown of Castile), Arabic or Old French.

Chapters 
Chapter I: Prologue

Chapters 2–4: Ancestors

Chapter 5: The holiness of his conception and baptism

Chapters 6–7: Dedicated to his parents Peter II of Aragon "the Catholic" and Maria of Montpellier.

Chapter 8–9: Tragic death of his father King Peter II of Aragon "the Catholic" at the battle of Muret in 1213 defending his vassal lords, against the Frankish crusaders who were invading Occitania, in the context of the Albigensian Crusade (also called the Cathar Crusade). The Captivity of King James I of Aragon by Simon de Montfort, 5th Earl of Leicester, commander of the Frankish crusaders.

Chapter 10: Liberation of James I of Aragon, "the Conqueror" (he is 6 or 7 years old)

Chapter 11: Cortes de Lerida (Courts of Lerida)

Chapters 12–14: James' stay at Monzón Castle, where he was raised by the Templar Knights

Chapters 15–16: 1st Revolt of the Nobility

Chapters 17–19: Wedding with Eleanor of Castile

Chapters 20–25: 2nd Revolt of the Nobility

Chapters 26–34: 3rd Revolt of the Nobility

Chapters 35–46: War for the County of Urgell

Chapters 47–117: Conquest of Mallorca

Chapters 118–124: Submission of the island of Menorca (within the Balearic Islands, from the Muslim taifas by the Treaty of Capdepera

Chapters 125–126: Conquest of island of Ibiza in the Balearic Islands, from the Muslim taifas, all three islands forming the Christian Kingdom of Majorca)

Chapters 127–289: Southern Conquest of Valencia from the Moors' 'taifa' (formation of Kingdom of Valencia)

Codices and editions 

Five codices of the text from the 14th century and two from the 15th are preserved, all based on a translation of the original Catalan text into Latin by the Dominican friar Pere Marsili at the order of King James' grandson (his namesake James II of Aragon). He intended to adapt the original text to contemporary manners and style, as can be read:

[...] So that the deeds of His glorious grandfather (James I), collected in a truthful but vulgar style, shall be put to date and once translated to Latin, form a single History volume, a full chronicle in which all the actions of the king his grandfather (James I the Conqueror) will be woven together.

Friar Pere Marsili finished this royal assignment on 2 April 1313, and then petitioned the king that a copy of the manuscript be made for the Friars Preachers of Majorca, his homeland, to be used on the day of the "Feast of the Banner":

<blockquote>[...] with the purpose of the last day of the year, the annual feast which commemorates the conquest of the city of Majorca, for God's glory and the eternally worshiping memory of his Luckiest Prince (James I), and so the friars who preach on this significative solemn date in front of the whole clergy and people, could rely to this book, and more firmly be informed of the truth of the facts."</blockquote>

The official delivery of the Cronice Illustrissimi Regis Aragonum domini Jacobi victorissimi principis was made on 2 June 1314 at the Church of the Friars Preachers (església dels frares predicadors) of Valencia.

Six official copies of the Latin translation by Pere Marsili exist. Four dating from the 14th century (conserved respectively in the National Library of Catalonia, the Archives of the Kingdom of Majorca, the Archives of the Cathedral of Palma de Majorca and the University of Barcelona's Library). A copy from the 17th century is kept at the Archives of the Crown of Aragon and another from the 19th in the Real Academia de la Historia of Spain.
left|thumb|1343 Catalan manuscript Prologue Dated to 1343, the oldest surviving codex in the original Catalan language is the copy ordered by Ponç de Copons, the abbot of the Poblet Monastery, as mentioned:

Aquest libre féu escriure l'onrat en Ponç de Copons, per la gràcia de Déu, abbat de l'honrat monestir de Sancta Maria de Poblet, en lo qual monestir jau lo molt alt senyor En Jaume, aqueyl que aquest libre parla, dels feyts que féu ni li endevengueren en la sua vida

(English: This book was ordered by the honorable Ponç de Copons, by God's grace, abbot of the St Maria Poblet Monastery, where there lies the most high Lord Sir James, the one about who the book tells, about the deeds and acts that he encountered in his lifetime). Friar Celestí des Torrents, who finished this manuscript on 17 September 1343.

This copy from the Poblet Monastery was made from an original manuscript owned by the Royal Chancellery. On 11 November 1343, King Peter IV of Aragon sent a letter to the abbot of the Poblet Monastery demanding the return of the original codex In 1585 King Philip II of Spain visited the Poblet Monastery and ordered a copy of the chronicle for the Royal Library of San Lorenzo de El Escorial, Madrid.

The second Catalan codex manuscript source, dating to 1380, comes directly from the Royal Chancellery of King Peter IV of Aragon, and must be a direct copy of the original, as the king himself commanded Johan de Barbastro to make it. The text in Latin:

Mandato serenissimi domini petri dei gratir regis Aragonum valentiae, Majoricarum, cardinieae et Corsicae, Comitisque Barchinonae, Rossilionis et Ceritaniae [...] Ego Iohannes de Barbastro de scribania predicti domini Regis Aragonum, oriundus Cesaraugustae scripsi Ciuitate Barchinonae Anno a Nativitate Dmi. Mo. CCCo. octuagesimo sripsi

(English: By order of Peter, by God's Grace King of Aragon, Valencia, Majorca, Sardinia and Corsica, Count of Barcelona, Roussillon and Cerdanya [...] I Johan de Barbastro, scribe chosen by the King of Aragon [...] in the City of Barcelona, year of The Lord's Nativity, 1380)

Its prologue, in Catalan, reads:

Aquest es lo començament del prolech sobre el libre que feu el rey en Jacme per la gracia de Deu rey de Arago e de Mallorches e de Valencia, comte de Barchinona e d'Urgell e senyor de Muntpesler de tots los fets e de les gracies que Nostre Senyor li féu en la sua vida

(English: This is the beginning of the prologue about the book that King James made, by Holy Grace, King of Aragon, of Majorca and Valentia, Count of Barcelona and Count of Urgell, and Lord of Montpellier, of all his deeds and gifts our Lord gave to him in his lifetime.)

A relevant fact about this copy is that Johan de Barbastro used an official codex from the Royal Chancellerie (now disappeared). King Pere IV ("the Ceremonious") ordered three copies: one for Majorca, one for Barcelona and another for Valencia. Only the Majorcan copy has survived, and is now preserved in the National Library of Catalonia.

This first printed edition was ordered and paid for by the Jury of the city of Valencia in 1557. Made in a period of historical inquiries, once the print was finished, a copy was sent to Madrid to King Philip II of Spain (known by the Catalans as Philip II of Castile) from the House of Habsburg, who had also been very interested in the manuscript codex kept in the Poblet Monastery. 

Other manuscripts have survived, all copies of the one made for the Poblet Monastery in 1343. There is one relevant codex between them conserved in the library of the University of Barcelona made by student Jaume Ferrera by order of his master, Prior Jaume Ramon Vila, who added a prologue, which is its singular feature. The Prior explains the reason he ordered the present copy of the Llibre dels fets, was "to deny the forgery issues that Castilian historians were throwing at Catalans". He indicates as well that the illustrations are faithful copies of the manuscript dated 1343 from the Poblet Monastery. The other relevant feature of this codex is the second original illustration that did not survive from the Poblet manuscript. In this picture the Mayor of the Palace, Hugh de Forcalquier, and Blasco de Alagón are kneeling before James I.

NotesThis article incorporates information translated from the equivalent article on the Catalan Wikipedia''.

External links
Chronica o comentaris del gloriosissim e invictissim Rey en Jacme Primer Rey d'Aragó, de Mallorques e de Valencia compte de Barcelona e de Montpesler. 
 Translation in English

Iberian chronicles
13th-century history books
Crown of Aragon
Medieval Catalan literature
Reconquista
Albigensian Crusade
Knights Templar
14th-century illuminated manuscripts
Illuminated histories